The Liber Regalis (Latin for "Royal Book") is an English medieval illuminated manuscript which was, most likely, compiled in 1382 to provide details for the coronation service for Richard II's consort, Anne of Bohemia. Other sources suggest that it may have been compiled in 1308 for the coronation of Edward II. The Liber Regalis contains the ordo (order) for the following events: the coronation of a king, a king and queen and a queen alone, and details regarding the funeral of a king; each liturgy opens with a full-page illustration depicting the event.

The manuscript provided the order of service for all subsequent coronations up to, and including, that of Elizabeth I. For the coronation of James I the liturgy was translated into English. Nevertheless, with occasional adaptations to suit the political and religious circumstances of the time, the Liber Regalis remained the basis for all later coronation liturgies. The manuscript belongs to Westminster Abbey (MS 38).

Bibliography

References

14th-century books
14th-century illuminated manuscripts
Christian illuminated manuscripts
14th century in England
Westminster Abbey
Medieval documents of England